The ANU College of Engineering, Computing and Cybernetics is a constituent body of the Australian National University, comprising the School of Computing, School of Engineering, and School of Cybernetics. The College has roughly 150 academic staff, 100 general staff, 200 higher degree research students, and 1,000 undergraduate students.

History

The Research School of Information Sciences and Engineering (RSISE) was established on 1 January 1994. RSISE resulted from the merger of the Department of Systems Engineering (1981) and the Computer Sciences Laboratory (1988), both of which were part of the Research School of Physical Sciences and Engineering (RSPhysSE). The Faculty of Engineering and Information Technology (FEIT) was established in 1993, and the Research School joined in 2004 to form a single institute that would become ANU College of Engineering and Computer Science (CECS) on 1 January 2006. In October 2022, the College was renamed to ANU College of Engineering, Computing and Cybernetics.

Student life
The ANU Computer Science Students Association (ANU CSSA) caters to the needs of IT, Computer Science and Software Engineering (CSIT) students. The organisation had existed since at least 1995, and was relaunched in 2011 and was allocated with a common room located in the Computer Science & Information Technology Building at ANU.

The ANU Engineering Students Association (ANU ESA) caters to the needs of Engineering students.

References

External links
 ANU College of Engineering and Computer Science

Australian National University
1994 establishments in Australia